The Mid-State Athletic Conference (MSAC) is a junior college conference located within Region III of the National Junior College Athletic Association (NJCAA). The MSAC has 8 member schools, all located in Upstate New York. Conference championships are held in most sports and individuals can be named to All-Conference teams.

Member schools

Current members 
The Mid-State currently has seven full members, all are public schools:

Notes

Former members 
The Mid-State had three former full members, all but one were public schools:

Notes

History
This conference began during the 1987–88 school year.  Prior to this, a proposal was brought forward to the Athletic Directors of the original members (listed below) by Mr. Larry Hinkle, Director of Athletics at Tompkins Cortland CC. The concept was approved and each A.D. received approval from his/her college president. After collaboration with other conferences already formed within Region III, Mr. Hinkle drafted MSAC by-laws.  After review and minor tweaking, the by-laws were approved and officers were elected.  The result was that the Mid-State Athletic Basketball Conference was officially formed.  As sports were added, it became the Mid-State Athletic Conference. The original members were:

 Broome Community College
 Cayuga Community College
 Cazenovia College
 Finger Lakes Community College
 Jefferson Community College
 Onondaga Community College
 Tompkins Cortland Community College

In the early 1990s, SUNY Canton was added as well as Corning Community College. Columbia-Greene Community College joined from the Mountain Valley Athletic Conference for the 2016-17 school year.

See also 
 Athletics in upstate New York
 National Junior College Athletic Association (NJCAA)
 Sports in Syracuse, New York

References

External links 
 Larry Hinkle – former Director of Athletics at Tompkins Cortland Community College (1986–2000) 
 NJCAA Website
 NJCAA Region 3 Website

NJCAA conferences
Conferences